The 1978–79 season was the 99th season of competitive football by Rangers.

Overview
Rangers played a total of 61 competitive matches during the 1978–79 season. The early season league form was terrible as the team failed to win any of the first six league matches but a run was put together. Things began to unravel, however, as leadership of the league evaporated. The team had to settle for second place behind champions Celtic. The pivotal match was a 4-2 Old Firm defeat a Parkhead. There was success for Greig in the national cup competitions. Victory in the 1979 Scottish Cup Final over Hibernian required a second replay to separate the sides before Rangers eventually won 3–2. The 1979 Scottish League Cup Final ended in a 2–1 win for Rangers over a strong Aberdeen with goals from Alex MacDonald and Colin Jackson.

Wallace's treble-winning team of the previous season performed well in the European Cup. Rangers eliminated Juventus after defeating the Italians 2–1 on aggregate - the first time Rangers had ever recovered from a first-leg defeat to win a two-legged European tie. Dutch side PSV Eindhoven, the then UEFA Cup holders, were overcome in the next round (the club's first home defeat in European competition), before an injury-stricken Rangers side lost to Cologne at the quarter-final stage.

Results
All results are written with Rangers' score first.

Scottish Premier Division

European Cup

Scottish Cup

League Cup

Non-competitive

Tennent Caledonian Cup

Glasgow Cup

*Rangers won the match 4–3 on penalties

Appearances

League table

See also
 1978–79 in Scottish football
 1978–79 Scottish Cup
 1978–79 Scottish League Cup
 1977–78 European Cup

References 

 

Rangers F.C. seasons
Rangers
Rangers